The Premier Volleyball League 1st Season Open Conference (All-Filipino Conference) is the second conference of the Premier Volleyball League (29th conference of the former Shakey's V-League). The conference started on July 1, 2017 at the Filoil Flying V Centre, San Juan. The tournament will have four new teams; two in the women's division (Adamson Lady Falcons and UP Fighting Lady Maroons) and two in the men's division (Megabuilders and Gamboa Coffee).

Women's division

Participating Teams

Preliminary round

All times are in Philippine Standard Time (UTC+08:00)

Final round

 All series are best-of-3

Semifinals
Rank 1 vs Rank 4

Rank 2 vs Rank 3

Finals
3rd Place

Championship

Men's division

Participating Teams

Preliminary round

All times are in Philippine Standard Time (UTC+08:00)

Fourth-seed playoff

 Sta. Elena Wrecking Balls advances to the semifinals round.

Final round

Semifinals
Rank 1 vs Rank 4

Rank 2 vs Rank 3

Finals
3rd Place

Championship

Awards

Final standings

References

2017 in Philippine sport
Premier Volleyball League (Philippines) 2017 Season
Shakey's V-League